Gridley Township is located in McLean County, Illinois. As of the 2010 census, its population was 1,913 and it contained 790 housing units.

History
Gridley Township was named for Asahel Gridley, an Illinois state senator.

Geography

Demographics

References

External links
City-data.com
Illinois State Archives

Townships in McLean County, Illinois
Townships in Illinois